Paul's Boutique is the second studio album by American hip hop group Beastie Boys, released on July 25, 1989, by Capitol Records. Produced by the Beastie Boys and the Dust Brothers, the album's composition makes extensive use of samples, drawn from a wide range of genres including funk, soul, rock, and jazz. It was recorded over two years at Matt Dike's apartment and the Record Plant in Los Angeles.

Paul's Boutique did not match the sales of the group's 1986 debut Licensed to Ill, and was promoted minimally by Capitol. However, despite its initial commercial failure, it became recognized as the group's breakthrough achievement, with its innovative lyrical and sonic style earning them a position as critical favorites within the hip-hop community. Sometimes described as the "Sgt. Pepper of hip-hop", Paul's Boutique has placed on several lists of the greatest albums of all time, and is viewed by many critics as a landmark album of golden age hip hop and a seminal work in sample-based production.

Background 
Derided as one-hit wonders and estranged from their previous producer, Rick Rubin, and record label, Def Jam, Beastie Boys were in self-imposed exile in Los Angeles during early 1988, after being written off by most music critics. Following the commercial success of Licensed to Ill, the group was focusing on making an album with more creative depth and less commercial material. The group's previous album had been enormously popular and received acclaim among both mainstream and hip hop music critics, although its simple, heavy beats and comically juvenile lyrics led to its label as frat hip hop. The group signed with Capitol Records and EMI Records.

Production 

Paul's Boutique was produced with the Dust Brothers, whose use of sampling helped establish the practice of multi-layered sampling as an art in itself. While the Dust Brothers were set on making a hit record, they agreed with the group on producing a more experimental and sonically different record. In total, 105 songs are sampled, including 24 individual samples on the last track alone. The Dust Brothers produced the backing tracks with the intention of releasing an instrumental album, but were persuaded by Beastie Boys to use them as the basis of their album.

Contrary to popular belief, most of the sampling for Paul's Boutique was eventually cleared, but at dramatically lower costs compared to today's rates. According to Sound on Sound, most of the samples were authorized "easily and affordably, something that [...] would be 'unthinkable' in today's litigious music industry." Mario "Mario C" Caldato Jr., engineer on the album, said that "we realized we had spent a lot of money in the studio. We had spent about a $1/4 million in rights and licensing for samples." This type of sampling was only possible before Grand Upright Music, Ltd. v. Warner Bros. Records Inc., the landmark lawsuit against Biz Markie by Gilbert O'Sullivan, which changed hip hop artists' approach to sampling.

Speaking about the album 20 years on, Adam Yauch said:
The Dust Brothers had a bunch of music together, before we arrived to work with them. As a result, a lot of the tracks come from songs they'd planned to release to clubs as instrumentals – "Shake Your Rump," for example. They'd put together some beats, basslines and guitar lines, all these loops together, and they were quite surprised when we said we wanted to rhyme on it, because they thought it was too dense. They offered to strip it down to just beats, but we wanted all of that stuff on there. I think half of the tracks were written when we got there, and the other half we wrote together.

All the tracks were recorded in Matt Dike's living room in Los Angeles, with the exception of the "Hello Brooklyn" and "A Year and a Day" from the "B-Boy Bouillabaisse" suite; "A Year and a Day" was recorded in Yauch's apartment building in Koreatown, Los Angeles. The location of recording was credited in the album liner notes as the Opium Den. The recordings for Paul's Boutique were later mixed by the Dust Brothers at Record Plant Studios in Los Angeles.

The album is named after a store the group made up called Paul's Boutique. On the cover of the album, the group hung a sign saying "Paul's Boutique" on an existing clothing store called Lee's Sportswear at the corner of Rivington and Ludlow streets, in Manhattan's Lower East Side.

Release 

The cover art and gatefold is a photograph of Ludlow Street (as shot from 99 Rivington Street), credited to Nathanial Hörnblowér, but shot by Jeremy Shatan, who was the original bassist for the Beastie Boys, when they were known as The Young Aborigines.

On its initial release, Paul's Boutique was commercially unsuccessful because of its experimental and dense sampling and lyricism, in contrast to the group's previous album, Licensed to Ill. It was a commercial disappointment, peaking at only #24 on the Top R&B/Hip-Hop Albums chart, and #14 on the Billboard 200 chart. The album received a gold certification by the Recording Industry Association of America on September 22 of its release year; it went on to sell over 2 million copies by January 1999 and was certified double platinum. The album was re-released in a 20th anniversary package remastered in 24-bit audio and featuring a commentary track on January 27, 2009.

Critical reception 

Contemporary reviews of Paul's Boutique were uniformly positive, with the production singled out for praise. David Handelman of Rolling Stone said the songs are "buoyed by the deft interplay of the three voices and a poetic tornado of imagery", featuring "equally far-flung" musical samples on an album that is "littered with bullshit tough-guy bravado, but it's clever and hilarious bullshit". Greg Kot of the Chicago Tribune commended the Dust Brothers' "deft" production and Beastie Boys' rhymes, which he called "hilarious, vicious, surreal, snotty." David Stubbs of Melody Maker agreed, praising the Dust Brothers' production and calling the record "an outrageously funky triumph". Although he felt the group's performance did not match the quality of the production, he nevertheless considered the album a welcome return for the band after a three-year hiatus. In Musician magazine, Jon Young noted the group's various pop culture references and numerous samples, and overall commended them for releasing another "classic LP".

Writing for NME, Roger Morton gave praise to Paul's Boutique, finding that in terms of "weight of ideas", Licensed to Ill "shrinks to nothing in comparison". Danny Weizmann in LA Weekly commended the group's evolution from "juvenile delinquents" on Licensed to Ill, to "psychedelic gurus". He went on to praise the Dust Brothers' production, the layers of samples, and felt the closing track "B-Boy Bouillabaisse" will "probably change the face of all hip-hop for a long time to come". He concluded his review stating: "This album will surely put an end to any notion that the Beastie Boys were a one-shot or a producer's creation." In Q magazine, Charles Shaar Murray was less positive. He felt that the group failed to evolve from their debut, calling them "still unlistenable and uncivilized". He overall considered the samples "ill-matched" and the group's performance subpar.

Robert Christgau said although it "doesn't jump you the way great rap usually does", "the Beasties and Tone-Lōc's Dust Brothers have worked out a sound that sneaks up on you with its stark beats and literal-minded samples, sometimes in a disturbing way." He commended them for "bearing down on the cleverest rhymes in the biz" and wrote, "the Beasties concentrate on tall tales rather than boasting or dissing. In their irresponsible, exemplary way, they make fun of drug misuse, racism, assault and other real vices fools may accuse them of." In Christgau's Record Guide: The '80s (1990), he said the album's "high-speed volubility and riffs from nowhere will amaze and delight you", calling it "an absolutely unpretentious and unsententious affirmation of cultural diversity, of where [the group] came from and where they went from there."

Legacy 

Since Paul's Boutique was first released, its critical standing has improved significantly. NME critic Paul Moody found the album to "still [be] an electrifying blast of cool" in a 1994 review, viewing it as a "younger incarnation" of Ill Communication. Rob Chapman, writing for Mojo, asserted that the album "shredded the rulebook" and called it "one of the most inventive rap albums ever made". In a 2003 review for Rolling Stone, Rob Sheffield called it "a celebration of American junk culture that is still blowing minds today—even fourteen years of obsessive listening can't exhaust all the musical and lyrical jokes crammed into Paul's Boutique". In a 2009 review, Mark Kemp of Rolling Stone called the album a "hip-hop masterpiece". Nate Patrin of Pitchfork described it "a landmark in the art of sampling, a reinvention of a group that looked like it was heading for a gimmicky early dead-end, and a harbinger of the pop-culture obsessions and referential touchstones that would come to define the ensuing decades' postmodern identity". Stephen Thomas Erlewine summed the initial reaction to Paul's Boutique and praised the density that the album contains:

In a Vibe interview of all three Beastie Boys, Chuck D of Public Enemy was quoted as saying that the "dirty secret" among the black hip-hop community at the time of release was that "Paul's Boutique had the best beats." During the same Vibe interview, Mike D was asked about any possible hesitation he or the band might have had regarding their overt sampling of several minutes of well-known Beatles background tracks, including the song "The End" on "The Sounds of Science". He claimed that the Beatles filed preliminary legal papers, and that his response was "What's cooler than getting sued by the Beatles?"

In the book For Whom the Cowbell Tolls: 25 Years of Paul's Boutique, host of KDOC's Request Video Gia DeSantis discussed the appeal of the album to local markets and the missed opportunity by Capitol Records to take the album over the top. The book was a follow-up to 33 1/3's book Paul's Boutique.

Noting that Paul's Boutique was less commercially successful than the group's chart-topping debut had been, Consequence.net's Marcus Shorter wrote, "Paul’s Boutique sat at a finish line waiting for the rest of the world to catch up."

Accolades 
List of the album's rankings and listings on selected publications and top album lists:
 Ranked #5 on Slant Magazines "Best Albums of the 1980s"
 Ranked #37 on Blender's "The 100 Greatest American Albums of All Time"
 Ranked #2 on Ego Trip's "Hip Hop's 25 Greatest Albums by Year (1980–1998)"
 Ranked #125 on "Rolling Stone's 500 Greatest Albums of All Time"
 Ranked #12 on Spin's "100 Greatest Albums, 1985–2005"
 Ranked #74 on VH1's "Top 100 Albums"
 Ranked #98 on Q's "Q Magazine Readers' 100 Greatest Albums Ever"
 Ranked #3 on Pitchforks 2002 "Top 100 Albums of the 1980s", and #15 on its 2018 "200 Best Albums of the 1980s"
 Selected as one of Rolling Stone magazine's "The Essential 200 Rock Records"
 Selected as one of TIME magazine's "100 Greatest Albums of All TIME"
 Selected by Rhapsody as one of "The 10 Best Albums by White Rappers"
Based on its appearances in professional rankings and listings, the aggregate website Acclaimed Music lists Paul's Boutique as 4th most acclaimed album of 1989, the 17th most acclaimed album of the 1980s and the 90th most acclaimed album in history. The album was also included in the book 1001 Albums You Must Hear Before You Die.

Lost tracks 
In 2013, music journalists Dan LeRoy and Peter Relic revealed that they had uncovered and restored a tape that represented Beastie Boys' first recording session in Delicious Vinyl's colloquially named Delicious Studios. The tape includes demo versions of six tracks, five of which were produced and utilized in some form on Paul's Boutique. Most notably, the track "The Jerry Lewis" was omitted. Mike D was presented with the restored version of this track in 2013, and when asked if it deserved an official release, he said "Probably not this year." After widespread publication of the story, "The Jerry Lewis" has become a highly sought-after "lost track" among dedicated fans.

Track listing

Personnel 
 Beastie Boys – production
 Allen Abrahamson – assistant engineer
 Mario Caldato Jr. –  engineer
 Mike Simpson – producer, turntables, ensemble
 The Dust Brothers – production
 Matt Dike – ensemble
 Ricky Powell – photography
 Jeremy Shatan – photography
 Nathaniel Hörnblowér – photography
 Dominick Watkins – photography

Charts

Certifications

See also 
 Album era

Footnotes

References

External links 
 

1989 albums
Beastie Boys albums
Capitol Records albums
Albums produced by the Dust Brothers
Albums produced by Mario Caldato Jr.
Albums recorded at Record Plant (Los Angeles)
Hip hop albums by American artists